Pegasus Field  was an airstrip in Antarctica, the southernmost of three airfields serving McMurdo Station. It closed due to excessive melting in the summer season caused by warmer temperatures combined with dust and dirt blown in from nearby Black Island. The last flight was on December 8, 2016 and it was replaced by Phoenix Airfield  with flights expected to start in February 2017.

Pegasus was originally conceived as a blue ice runway capable of handling wheeled aircraft year-round, but as it was developed, it was enhanced with a 4-inch layer of compacted snow on top—thus more properly characterizing it as a white ice runway.
 Other local runways are the snow runways at Williams Field  that are limited to ski-equipped aircraft, and the Ice Runway  on the sea-ice available during the summer Antarctic field season.

The field is named after Pegasus, a C-121 Lockheed Constellation that made a forced landing on unprepared terrain in bad weather on October 8, 1970. None of the 80 on board were seriously injured. The aircraft remains in-situ near the airfield as of 2019, and has remained well preserved. It is generally covered with snow, but is occasionally excavated by visitors wishing to photograph it.

On September 11, 2008, a United States Air Force C-17 Globemaster III successfully completed the first landing in Antarctica using night-vision goggles at Pegasus Field. Previously air transport in the permanent darkness of the winter was only used in emergencies, with burning barrels of fuel to outline the runway.

Gallery

See also
 List of airports in Antarctica

References

External links

 Airfields on Antarctic Glacier Ice Malcolm Mellor and Charles Swithinbank, CRREL 1989.
 Lockheed Aircraft R7V-1 / R7V-1P / C-121J "Constellation" "Connie"
 Installation of runway-Pegasus
 Runway Project Clears the Way for Improved Antarctic Airlift National Science Foundation. February 20, 2002.
 Construction, Maintenance, and Operation of a Glacial Runway, McMurdo Station, Antarctica George L. Blaisdell et al., CRREL Monograph 98–1, March 1998.
 

Defunct airports
Airports in the Ross Dependency
McMurdo Station
Airports in Antarctica
Airports disestablished in 2016
2016 disestablishments in Antarctica